William Walker was a professional baseball center fielder in the Negro leagues. He played with the St. Louis Stars in 1937.

References

External links
 and Seamheads

St. Louis Stars (1937) players
Year of birth missing
Year of death missing
Baseball outfielders